The Nordestino, also known as Crioulo Nordestino, Mourão, Pé Duro Nordestino or Sertanejo do Nordeste, is a breed of horses native to the Northeast Region of Brazil. The breed is near extinction due to the lack of interest in maintaining it.
It is the first native horse breed of Brazil, and derived from the first horses brought by Portuguese settlers in the sixteenth century. Over time the horses have evolved into a small breed very well-adapted to surviving in the local semi-arid climate of the Northeast Region. Today around 500,000 horses (purebred and mixed) survive in the region pulling horse carts or in cattle work.

History

Origin 
With the discovery of Brazil by the Portuguese the horse was introduced into South America where it was nonexistent.
In 1549 it was introduced into the Northeast Region of Brazil through the efforts of Duarte Coelho, first grantee of the Captaincy of Pernambuco, that when establishing along the Rio dos Currais (now São Francisco River) cattle farms (provided with cattle and horses) was the precursor of this new breed.
This breed was originated from a mixture of runaway farm horses, abandoned horses and horses that survived aboriginal attacks on cattle farms.

Genetic background 
It descends mainly from Iberian horse breeds, namely the Garrano, Sorraia and the Barb horse.
These horses were brought mainly from Madeira Island, Cape Verde and Continental Portugal.

Currently 
For several centuries this breed was used by the Brazilian vaquero as a work horse all over the Northeast Sertão. With the almost complete disappearance of this profession at the end of the 20th century, the breed followed the same path. Today few specimens remain.

Characteristics 
This breed is highly adapted to the semi-arid climate of the Brazilian Northeast Sertão. It withstands dry and hot environments and can feed and subsist on low nutritional quality plants with scarce or unhealthy water.
Besides having a low stature (typical of the Brazilian corral horse breeds) it also resists hoof wear due to its very hard hooves. This is the reason why it is also called  ("hard foot").
The majority of specimens have a natural ambling gait.

Standard morphological characteristics:
 Profile – Straight but sometimes concave profile. Light body with an average of 150 kg(330 lbs) to 250 kg(551 lbs) in weight. Long legs and short coat all year round.
 Height – Even though they are less than 150 centimeters (59.1 in; 14.3 hands) at the withers, they are not considered ponies as conformed in the studbook. Adults measure between 130 cm (51 in; 12.8 hands) and 150 cm (59 in; 14.8 hands) at the withers.
 Colors – The most common coat color is brown (similar to the Garrano), but it also can be grey (flea-bitten and dapple grey) or red dun.

 Temperament – Active, docile and apt to cattle work, saddle riding and sports.
 Gait – Besides the easy and fast natural gait, it easily produces a natural ambling gait that allows a smooth-riding four-beat footfall pattern.
 Fitness – Good for saddle riding and also for work (especially cart wagons). Very good aptitude for pursuing cattle with the vaqueiros in the thorny forests of the caatinga.

Associations of breeders and enthusiasts 
They try to preserve the breed and its characteristics.

Breed status in the Ministry of Agriculture (Brazil) (MAPA) 
The Brazilian Ministry of Agriculture (MAPA) recognizes the breed, the standard of which was submitted for analysis and approved in 1987. However, this was not enough to consolidate an organized breeding program for the breed and attract more interested parties. In a document made available in 2016, based on data from 2013, the ministry warns of the need for organization of the breed and that there are currently estimated 500,000 live animals including purebred and crossbred animals. In the same document the MAPA indicates that the association responsible for the breed has been inactive for eight years, without mentioning its name. This revoked authorization was given in 1974. 
Currently several associations are taking the registry of the line breeds into their hands.

References